Limonius californicus, the sugarbeet wireworm, is a species of click beetle in the family Elateridae.

References

Further reading

 
 
 

Elateridae